Claire Maytham is a basketball player for England women's national basketball team. She won a bronze medal at the 2006 Commonwealth Games. She was named skipper of England's first women's basketball squad that competed at the Commonwealth Games.

References

Living people
English women's basketball players
Place of birth missing (living people)
1976 births
Point guards
Commonwealth Games medallists in basketball
Commonwealth Games bronze medallists for England
Basketball players at the 2006 Commonwealth Games
Medallists at the 2006 Commonwealth Games